Ilougane: is a small village located in the outskirts of Béjaïa and its neighbouring Bordj Bou Arréridj in Algeria. As they were highly influenced by Islamic culture when Islam was introduced to North Africa, they adopted Arabic as the main language of the village second to the Amazigh language in respect to the Islamic Prophet Mohamed.  The village is currently deserted as its most inhabitants left for better living conditions in neighbouring cities in late 1970s, mostly to Bordj Bou Arreridj, and the remainder were forced to flee during the years of the so-called terrorism in Algeria in the late 1980s to early 1990s.

Villages in Algeria